Hackelia diffusa is a species of flowering plant in the family Boraginaceae known by the common name spreading stickseed.

Distribution and habitat
The plant grows east of the Cascades in British Columbia, Washington and Oregon. Its habitats include rocky cliffs, talus slopes, and shrub steppe.

Description
Hackelia diffusa is a perennial herb from 2 to 7 dm tall. The lower part of the plant is covered with spreading, stiff hairs, while the upper has appressed hairs.

It has an inflorescence of false-racemes with numerous white flowers that have a yellow center. The boom period is from May to July. The fruits are clusters of four nutlets that have marginal and intramarginal prickles.

References

External links

diffusa
Flora of Washington (state)
Flora of Oregon
Flora of British Columbia
Flora without expected TNC conservation status